Robert Sinclair (1 July 1817 – 20 October 1898) was born in London but came from a Caithness family. He became Chief Mechanical Engineer of several British railways and also worked in France. He retired to Italy, where he died.

Career

Early years
He was apprenticed to a shipbuilder and later worked for Robert Stephenson, the Grand Junction Railway and the Paris and Rouen Railway.

Chief mechanical engineer
He was Chief Mechanical Engineer of the Caledonian Railway (CR) from 1847–1856, the Eastern Counties Railway (ECR) from 1856–1862 and, following a merger of railways, of the Great Eastern Railway (GER) from 1862–1865.

Consulting engineer
Sinclair resigned from the GER 1865, and became a consulting engineer. In this capacity, he designed a fast 2-4-2 locomotive for the Great Luxemburg Railway, and an outside cylinder 2-4-0 for the East Indian Railway. The Luxembourg 2-4-2 design was later adapted into a 2-4-2T for commuter services on the GER.

Locomotive designs
 Caledonian, see Locomotives of the Caledonian Railway
 ECR/GER, see Locomotives of the Great Eastern Railway

Innovations
Sinclair was an early user of:
 the Giffard injector
 the use of steel for railway axles and wheel tyres
 roller bearings for carriages

References

Locomotive builders and designers
British railway pioneers
British railway mechanical engineers
1817 births
1898 deaths
Great Eastern Railway people
Caledonian Railway people
People educated at Charterhouse School
19th-century British businesspeople